Antti is a Finnish masculine given name derived from the Greek name Andreas. In Estonia, the variant Anti is more common. It is uncommon as a surname. 

People with the name include:

Given name

 Antti Autti (born 1985), Finnish snowboarder
 Antti Juntumaa (born 1959), Finnish boxer
 Antti Hammarberg (Irwin Goodman) (1943–1991), Finnish musician
 Antti Hyyrynen (born 1980), Finnish musician 
 Antti Kalliomäki (born 1947), Finnish athlete and Minister of Education
 Antti Kasvio (born 1973), Finnish swimmer
 Antti Laaksonen (born 1973), Finnish ice hockey player
 Antti Niemi (footballer) (born 1972), Finnish football goalkeeper
 Antti Niemi (ice hockey) (born 1983), Finnish ice hockey goalkeeper
 Antti Miettinen (born 1980), Finnish ice hockey player
 Antti Muurinen (born 1954), Finnish football coach
 Antti Ojanperä (born 1983), Finnish footballer
 Antti Okkonen (born 1982), Finnish footballer
 Antti Piimänen (1712-1775), Finnish church builder
 Antti Pohja (born 1977), Finnish footballer
 Antti Raanta (born 1989), Finnish ice hockey goalkeeper
 Antti Reini (born 1964), Finnish actor
 Antti Rinne (born 1962), Finnish politician
 Antti Sarpila (born 1964), Finnish swing/jazz musician
 Antti Sumiala (born 1974), Finnish footballer
 Antti Törmänen (born 1989), Finnish professional Go player
 Antti Uimaniemi (born 1986), Finnish footballer
 Antti Viskari (1928–2007), Finnish marathon runner

Surname

 Gerda Antti (born 1929), Swedish writer

See also

Anti (given name)
Antto (disambiguation)

Masculine given names
Finnish masculine given names